Round Lake is a lake located northwest of Woodgate, New York, in Oneida County, New York.

References 

Lakes of Oneida County, New York
Lakes of New York (state)